Kornos FC 2013 is a Cypriot association football club based in Kornos, Cyprus, located in the Larnaca District. It has 2 participations in STOK Elite Division. The club founded in 2013 after the merging of AEK Kornos and Anagennisi Kornou.

Football clubs in Cyprus
Association football clubs established in 2013
2013 establishments in Cyprus
Football clubs in Larnaca